Orders and decorations conferred to civil defence personnel of the Singapore Civil Defence Force in Singapore, listed by order of precedence:

Medals
  Commendation Medal (Pingat Kepujian)
  Efficiency Medal (Pingat Berkebolehan)
  Singapore Civil Defence Force Long Service and Good Conduct (35 Years) Medal
  Long Service Medal–Civil Defence (Pingat Bakti Setia (Pertahanan Awam))
 Home Team Operational Service Medal (Pingat Perkhidmatan Operasi Home Team)
  Singapore Civil Defence Force Long Service and Good Conduct
  Singapore Civil Defence Force Good Service Medal
  Singapore Civil Defence Force Overseas Service Medal

Badges and Specialist Tabs

Skills Badge
 Emergency Medical Service Badge
 Fire Badge

Marine Navigational Badges 
 Steersman
 Helmsman
 Bridge Watch-keeping Officer

Tabs
 DART Tab
 HAZMAT Tab
 Paramedic Level 3 Tab
 Paramedic Level 4 Tab
 EMT Tab
 Marine Tab
 K9 Search Tab
 Fire Investigator Tab
 CBRE Tab

IPPT Badges
 IPPT Gold Award Badge
 IPPT Silver Award Badge

Identification  Badge
 Paracounsellor Badge
 CDAU Volunteer Badge
 Aide-de-Camp Badge
 SCDF Expert Badge
 INSARAG National Accreditation Badge

Obsolete Badges & Tabs
 Physical Training Instructor Badge
 Driving Instructor Badge
 Paramedic Badge
 Medical Orderly Badge
 Rescue Tab
 Medic Tab

A badge known as the Civil Defence Triangle was awarded to servicemen from the then Singapore Joint Civil Defence Forces and Singapore Fire Service. The badge was only awarded for the Hotel New World incident and is classified as an award.

See also
 Awards For Singapore National Serviceman

References

External links
 Megan C. Robertson, Decorations and Medals of Singapore
 

Military awards and decorations of Singapore